Charles S. Dorion was an American painter during the late 19th to early 20th centuries, and was known for his moonlit Seascapes.

He typically signed his paintings in the lower left or right hand side as C.S. Dorion in the color red.

Very little is known of this artist, but his works continue to be auctioned off regularly.

Early years
Charles was most likely born in Quebec, Canada, and moved to New York City sometime after 1880.  He had a publishing company called C.S. Dorion, and was the 8th company to publish Edgar Allan Poe's the Raven, in New York in 1881.

Politics
During the 1890s, Charles Dorian socialized with New York City's Social Democratic Party's elite, and used his quick tongue and self-appointed crusading against injustice to help propel his friends political careers.

His first noted case was in the summer of 1893, when bucket shops were becoming a rampant problem in the city, as these "bucket shops" specializing in stocks and commodity futures, as the terms of trade were different for each bucket shop.  But, bucket shops typically catered to customers who traded on thin margins, even as low as 1%.   The problem being that most bucket shops refused to make margin calls, so that if the stock price fell even momentarily to the limit of the client's margin, the client would lose his entire investment.  So as stated on July 26, 1893, in The New York Times, Charles .S. Dorian was part of a class action lawsuit against stock broker Henry C. Friedman of over the margins of a bucket shop.

The next notable move was a poem he used as part of a NYC mayoral elections, political rally speech he gave against Henry George for the 1897 race.  On October 17, 1897, The New York Times reported that Charles .S. Dorian writes a campaign poem against George during the George's campaign, and published the following poem;

"There are days of deepest sorrow
In the season of our life,
There are wild, despairing moments,
There are hours of stony anguish,
When the tears refuse to fall."
But the day that George was Johnsoned
Was the saddest day of all!

"Longing once and longing ever,
It is sad to wait for years,
For the light whose fitful shining
Makes a rainbow of our tears."
But the day that George was Johnsoned
Was the saddest day of all!

For it broke the heart of thousands,
Every one a Democrat,
The day that George was Johnsoned
By that cunning trolley rat.
In is sad to hear your children
In vain for bread to call,
But the day that George was Johnsoned
Was the saddest day of all!

"It is sad to sleep in hallways
Because you have no bed,
It is sad to come from business
And find you mother dead,
It is sad to go out skating
And catch a heavy fall,
But the day that George was Johnsoned
Was the saddest day of all!"

It is sad to think the Rooster
May hatch some Gold Bug's eggs,
It is sad to have a trolly
Nassau off your legs,
It is sad to be caught napping
And miss the dinner call.
But the day that George was Johnsoned
Was the saddest day of all!"

When a NYC subway company switched their method of payment, from one type of token to another, they only allowed the new token carriers to ride and refused to accept any old tokens, Charles Dorian sued, on behalf of "John Doe" with attorney Eugene Brewster acting as his lawyer, as stated on  July 23, 1899, in The New York Times.   C.S. Dorian, filed a criminal action against the Brooklyn Rapid Transit Company as a strike sympathizer, with future Democratic Party NYC Attorney General, Eugene V. Brewster, acting as his lawyer. Brewster lost the election to John C. Davies.

Examples of Works

References

External links

American landscape painters
19th-century American painters
American male painters
20th-century American painters
Year of birth missing
Year of death missing
19th-century American male artists
20th-century American male artists